The Kinora was an early motion picture device. It was developed by the French inventors Auguste and Louis Lumière in 1895, while simultaneously working on the Cinematograph. It was patented in February 1896.

Basically a miniature version of the mutoscope for home use, the Kinora worked very much like a flip book in the shape of a Rolodex. It used conventional monochrome photographic prints fixed to strong, flexible cards attached to a circular core. A reel was revolved handle by turning a handle, making the pictures flip over against a static peg one by one. The moving pictures could be viewed through an eyepiece.

Or reels contained printed versions of films by the Lumières, later also films by other companies.

The Cinematograph proved very successful so the Lumières didn't bother about the Kinora, but passed the idea on to Gaumont who marketed the device and circa 100 different reels around 1900.

The British rights to the Kinora were bought by The British Mutoscope & Biograph Co. in 1898, but the machine was not marketed in the UK until 1902. It became popular in the UK and over 12 different viewer models and over 600 reels produced. Biograph had constructed a studio in London in 1900 to film moving portraits of families and individuals. Flip books of 60 pictures in standard Mutoscope size were produced there as Bio-Gems, before a Kinora reel portrait service became available in 1903.

In May 1907 Biograph chairman W.T. Smedley set up Kinora Limited in London. The company introduced the first amateur Kinora camera in 1908, using rolls of photographic paper or celluloid one inch wide that could be sent to the company for processing. A Kinora Grand for reels of 1,000 pictures of 2 1/2" by 3" also featured in their advertising booklet. By 1914, when the company's London factory burned down, public interest in the Kinora had declined, at a time when the cinema screen held greater attractions. The company did not rebuild the lost factory.

Notes

External links
Illustration and demonstration of the Kinora

Auguste and Louis Lumière
Film and video technology
History of film